Enthiran is a 2010 Indian Tamil-language science fiction film directed by S. Shankar and produced by Kalanithi Maran. Shankar wrote the screenplay and co-wrote the dialogues with Sujatha and Madhan Karky. The film stars Rajinikanth and Aishwarya Rai with Danny Denzongpa, Santhanam, and Karunas playing supporting roles. The musical score was composed by A. R. Rahman while the cinematography, visual effects, editing, and art direction were handled by R. Rathnavelu, V. Srinivas Mohan, Anthony, and Sabu Cyril respectively. The film's story revolves around a scientist's struggle to control his creation, an android robot whose software is upgraded to give it the ability to comprehend and generate human emotions. The plan backfires when the robot falls in love with the scientist's fiancée and is further manipulated by a rival scientist to bring destruction to all who stand in its way. The film was dubbed into Hindi as Robot.

Produced on an estimated budget of 1.32 billion, Enthiran was released on 1 October 2010 and yielded a revenue of 1.79 billion according to a report by the Sun TV Network. The film garnered awards and nominations in several categories, with particular praise for its cinematography, visual effects, art direction, costume design, and Rajinikanth's performance. The film has won 25 awards from 38 nominations.

At the 58th National Film Awards ceremony, Enthiran won two awards for Best Special Effects (Mohan) and Best Production Design (Cyril). The film was nominated in nine categories at the 58th Filmfare Awards South, winning Best Cinematographer (Rathnavelu), Best Art Director (Cyril), and Best Costume Design (Manish Malhotra). At the 5th Vijay Awards, the film was nominated in fourteen categories and won in seven, including Best Villain and Favourite Hero (Rajinikanth), Favourite Film (Maran), and Favourite Director (Shankar). Enthiran won three awards at the 12th IIFA Awards under the Best Special Effects, Best Art Direction, and Best Makeup categories. Among other wins, the film received three Norway Tamil Film Festival Awards, two Screen Awards and Ananda Vikatan Cinema Awards each, one Mirchi Music Award and Tamil Nadu State Film Awards each, and a special award at the 24th Tokyo International Film Festival.

Awards and nominations

See also 
 List of Tamil films of 2010

Notes

References

External links 
 Accolades for Enthiran at the Internet Movie Database

Enthiran
Lists of accolades by Indian film